Storm Carmel was an extratropical cyclone that was part of the 2021–22 European windstorm season.  Storm Carmel was named by the Hellenic National Meteorological Service on 16th December 2021. It is the first storm in the history of Israel to receive a name.

Preparations
Israel is expected to be impacted by winter storm Carmel.

Impact
Israel was heavily affected by Storm Carmel. At Ben Gurion Airport, more rain fell in two days than the monthly average. Mikveh Israel saw  of rainfall over those two days ( in one day), the third highest recorded rainfall there in the past century.
Cyprus suffered no significant damage in the storm. In Israel, two homeless people died in the coastal city of Bat Yam and another in Tel Aviv, from hypothermia. Another death happened because of a car accident caused by torrential rains, bringing the death toll up to 4.

See also
 Weather of 2021
 Storm Barra (Previous storm in the 2021–22 European windstorm season)

References

2021 meteorology
2021 natural disasters
2021 disasters in Asia
2021 in Israel